Tozkovak is small mountain village in Gülnar district of  Mersin Province, Turkey. At  it is situated in Toros Mountains. The population of the village was 63  as of 2012.

References

Villages in Gülnar District